Enderleinella obsoleta is a species of Psocoptera from Stenopsocidae family that can be found in Great Britain and Ireland. The species are brown coloured.

Habitat 
The species feed on juniper, oak, pine, spruce, western gorse, and yew.

References 

Stenopsocidae
Insects described in 1836
Psocoptera of Europe